Anigua is a settlement in the west of Guam. It is located just to the west of the capital, Hagåtña.

Populated places in Guam